Radoš Čubrić (20 January 1934 – 20 August 2017) was a Yugoslav cyclist. He competed in the individual road race and team time trial events at the 1972 Summer Olympics. Čubrić was born in Kraljevo, his profession was a repairman.

References

External links
 

1934 births
2017 deaths
Serbian male cyclists
Yugoslav male cyclists
Olympic cyclists of Yugoslavia
Cyclists at the 1972 Summer Olympics
Sportspeople from Kraljevo